The Assembly of People of Kazakhstan is a national political body in Kazakhstan consisting of delegates of the Regional Assemblies of the People. Its task is to represent the various ethnic groups that make up the Central Asian state at national level and to strengthen ethnic/religious coexistence in Kazakh society. It was established in 1995 by President Nursultan Nazarbayev, who served as assembly chairman until April 2021. The assembly is presently chaired by Kazakhstan's president Kassym-Jomart Tokayev.

Organization 
The APK consists of 384 representatives of all ethnic groups living in Kazakhstan drawn from the Regional Assemblies of the People. The law provides that all APK decisions be considered by public authorities and civil society institutions; APK Deputies participate in the legislative process and can propose legislation. APK Deputies elecedt 9 members to the Mazhilis until 2023 and the APK reviews all parliamentary laws to ensure that they are in conformity with the Constitution of Kazakhstan's articles on ethnic harmony and equality.

Sessions

 2015: The 22nd session of the APK was held on held on 22 April 2015, celebrating the 20th anniversary of the APK. During the session the Kazakh President proposed to introduce a national day of gratitude and mark it on 1 March, the day the APK was established.
 2016: On April 26, 2016, the 24th annual session of the Assembly of the People of Kazakhstan took place in Astana dedicated to the 25th anniversary of the country’s independence. The theme of the 2016 session was "Independence. Consent. Nation united future."
 2019: The 27th session conference was held in Nur-Sultan on 29 April 2019, with the theme being "Formula of Peace and Harmony: Unity and Modernization."

References

External links
 

Politics of Kazakhstan